The Mt. Popa parachute gecko (Gekko popaense) is a species of gecko. It is endemic to Myanmar.

References 

Gekko
Reptiles described in 2018